Cappella is an Italian Eurodance music group formed in 1987 by producer Gianfranco Bortolotti. The act went through a number of line-up changes over the years but was most successful in the early 1990s when it was fronted by British performers Kelly Overett and Rodney Bishop. Their biggest hit was "U Got 2 Let the Music", which reached No. 2 on the UK Singles Chart in 1993.

Background
The name Cappella was first used in 1987. In the beginning, they were a Hi-NRG influenced house act with producer Gianfranco Bortolotti of Media Records leading the group, with significant contributions from fellow producers Stefano Lanzini, Diego Leoni and Pieradis Rossini. In 1988, the act debuted on the UK Singles Chart with the song "Bauhaus (Push the Beat)", and the following year with "Helyom Halib" which peaked at number 11. At the time, the act was fronted by model Ettore Foresti, who served as the face of the group, but did not perform any of the vocals.

Three years later, Cappella scored another UK top 30 hit with "Take Me Away", which sampled Loleatta Holloway's "Love Sensation" – the same track that had been sampled on the number 1 hit "Ride On Time" by fellow Italian house act Black Box in 1989.

It was not until 1993 when Cappella really began to gain momentum. "U Got 2 Know" was based on the distinctive riff of Siouxsie and the Banshees' "Happy House". Vocalist Anna Ross and rapper MC Fixx It (Ricardo Overman) were chosen by Gianfranco for live performances. The song reached number 6 in the UK. Afterwards, two permanent members were drafted in to front the act: rapper Rodney Bishop from London and ex-SL2 dancer Kelly Overett from Ipswich. "U Got 2 Let the Music" (which sampled Alphaville's "Sounds Like a Melody") was released in October 1993 and climbed to number 2 on the UK Singles Chart, held off from the top spot only by Meat Loaf's "I'd Do Anything For Love (But I Won't Do That)". "U Got 2 Know" would later be remade and updated by Tomcraft in 2013.

Further hits followed: "Move On Baby" reached number 7 in February 1994, "U & Me" peaked at number 10 in June, and "Move It Up" ended the U Got 2 Know album project with a number 16 hit in October. At the end of the year, Overett left the group. It later emerged that she had not actually performed on any of the records. Though she occasionally performed and sang live, like "Move On Baby" live on Top of the Pops and during a telecast of M6's Dance Machine concert in 1994 in which she did perform "U & Me" live despite a playback in the background.

As for the real voices that were actually used, "U Got 2 Know" included Xaviera Gold's vocals from "You Used To Hold Me", "U Got 2 Let the Music" sampled a vocal from JM Silk's track "Let The Music Take Control", and the vocals for "U & Me" were sampled from a song by Vicki Shepard. "Move On Baby" and "Don't Be Proud" were sung by a session singer Eileina Dennis. The hit "Move It Up" was also sung by a session singer now known to be Jackie Rawe. Rap vocals were later confirmed to be performed by former member MC Fixx It. Overett later established a singing career by releasing a single called "Follow Your Heart" in 1995 under the name "Kelly O", although it was her only solo single.

In May 1995, Cappella returned with new vocalist Allison Jordan. Before joining Cappella, she had scored a number 23 hit in the UK Official Top 40 with "The Boy From New York City". Rodney Bishop was also replaced by Patrick Osborne, but returned to the group before long. Before Bishop returned to Cappella, he released two solo singles under the name 'Bishop' titled "Addicted" and "Lift Me Up".

The comeback single "Tell Me the Way" reached number 17 in the UK in September 1995 and was followed by the album War In Heaven, which featured contributions from Mauro Picotto. According to rumors, War in Heaven was almost completely recorded before Overett and Bishop were no longer part of the group. The rap performance on this album mostly consists of samples, but also once again features rap performances by MC Fixx It. The majority of the vocals on this album are from Jordan, however vocals on a few tracks were shared with Katherine Ellis, and some tracks on the album featured Ellis as the sole vocalist.

On 25 February 1998, Cappella released their fourth eponymously titled album. The album was supported by three singles, titled "Be My Baby", "U Tore My World Apart", and "Throwin' Away". It is now known that the lead vocals on the album were performed by British vocalist Lorna Bannon. The rap vocals were performed by Italian producer and remixer Tiziano Pagani. After the singles charted less than expected, the band decided to go on tour and promote the new album in Japan later in the same year. Once their Japanese tour was finished, Bishop left the group, and Cappella continued as a solo act with just Jordan for a brief time. Cappella released the single "U R the Power of Love" in September 1998, and shortly afterwards, Cappella disbanded and resorted to releasing remixes of previous hits.

In 2004, the act – now once again faceless, released a brand new trance track called "Angel" which failed to chart. The song features an unknown vocalist with rap samples from MC Fixx It directly from Anticappella's "Move Your Body". A greatest hits CD/DVD was released in August 2005.

In 2013, the band returned with the original producer Gianfranco Bortolotti and new members, a married couple: Lis Birks as a vocalist and Marcus Birks as a rapper. The couple used to perform under the name of The Cameleonz. Marcus Birks died on 27 August 2021 from COVID-19. He had been a Covid denialist and spoke with the BBC in August 2021:
"If you haven't been ill, you don't think you're going to get ill, so you listen to the [anti-vaccine] stuff. When you feel like you can't get enough breath, it's the scariest feeling in the world.

"First thing I am going tell all my family to do is get the vaccine and anybody I see, and as soon as I can get it, I am definitely getting it."

In January 2022, the band revealed on their Instagram page that Lis Birks will step down as a performer and instead manage the band alongside Gianfranco Bortolotti. Simultanesouly, the group introduced the new lineup of singer Vikki Waters and rapper Steve Lewis. The band embarked on a european tour from March through October. In June, Steve Lewis left the group and was replaced with Jay McCurdy.

In November 2022, former member Kelly Overett resurfaced online and shared many stories, memories and pictures from her time in the band. In an interview from the following month, she shared more details, including clearing up rumors on what led to the end of her time in the band and her brief solo career as Kelly O. 27 years after the release of "Follow Your Heart", Kelly revealed there is a music video and a follow up single called "Into The Light" previously left unreleased, and uploaded both of them on YouTube. When asked if she would ever return to performing with Cappella, she stated:

"I think I am open to appearing at the 90's festivals, which I had no idea of til recently. No. I wouldn't do this with Cappella. People keep saying things like "come back, the audience want to see you", which is crazy to me. I thought I was forgotten, replaced, and erased. If I do progress with anything it will be as Kelly O and a celebration of the music I was a part of."

In a joint statement with Dutch Eurodance group Twenty 4 Seven, it was announced that Kelly Overett will return to the stage performing alongside Stay-C for 2023 performances.

Former member Allison Jordan changed her name to Cloé Hedger and now works as a psychic medium, owns her own store and performs tarot card readings, a hobby she had during her time in the band. In the years after Cappella originally disbanded, she married her husband Stephen, and they ran a series of magazines called Paranormal, which lasted for several issues.

Members
Stage performers:
 Singer: Vikki Waters (2022-present)
 Singer: Lis Birks (2013–2021)
 Singer: Allison Jordan (1995-1998)
 Singer: Kelly Overett (1993-1995)
 Singer: Anna Ross (1992-1993)
 Singer: Ettore Foresti (1989-1991)
 Rapper: Jay McCurdy (2022-present)
 Rapper: Steven Lewis (2022)
 Rapper: Marcus Birks (2013–2021)
 Rapper: Rodney Bishop (1993-1995, 1995-1998)
 Rapper: Patrick Osbourne (1995)
 Rapper: Ricardo Overman (MC Fixx It) (1992-1993)

Recording artists:
 Singer: Vikki Waters (2022-present)
 Singer: Lis Birks (2013–2021)
 Singer: Lorna Bannon (1997-1998) (Lead vocals on "Cappella" album)
 Singer: Allison Jordan (1995-1996) (Lead vocals, shared lead vocals and backing vocals on the War In Heaven album)
 Singer: Katherine Ellis (1995-1996) (Lead vocals and shared lead vocals on the War In Heaven album)
 Singer: Jackie Rawe (1994) (Lead vocals on "Move It Up")
 Singer: Eileina Dennis (1994-1995) (Lead vocals on "Move On Baby", "U & Me" (Album Version), "Don't Be Proud")
 Rapper: Jay McCurdy (2022-present)
 Rapper: Steve Lewis (2022)
 Rapper: Marcus Birks (2013–2021)
 Rapper: Tiziano Pagani (1997-1998) (Rap performance on "Cappella" album)
 Rapper: Ricardo Overman (MC Fixx It) (1994-1996) (Rap performance on "Move On Baby, "U & Me", "Move It Up", and the War In Heaven album)

Most of the vocals on the U Got 2 Know album and the earlier Cappella tracks are sampled directly from other songs and not originally recorded for Cappella, which is why they are not included in this list.

Discography

Albums

Singles

See also
 49ers – One of Gianfranco Bortolotti's other Italo house acts of the era.
 Anticappella
 Nukleuz

References

External links
 Unofficial Fan Page in English
 Great Fan-Homepage in German and English
 Full Cappella Discography
 Information at Discogs
 [ Information at AllMusic]
 Forum in English, German, Nederlands and Français
 Coro de Música Sacra a Capela
 

Italian Eurodance groups
Italian electronic music groups
Musical groups established in 1987
Remixers